The Boondocks was an unproduced American adult animated sitcom created by Aaron McGruder in 2019 and loosely based upon his comic strip of the same name. Produced by Sony Pictures Animation, it was originally created to serve as the second television series based on the comic, following the 2005–2014 TV series that aired on Cartoon Network's Adult Swim programming block for four seasons. The series was set to premiere on HBO Max before development failed to get off the ground.

Premise 
The show was originally set to begin with a black family, the Freemans, settling into the fictional, friendly and overall white suburb of Woodcrest and follows them as they fight the regime of Uncle Ruckus, who rules over the community government. The perspective offered by this mixture of cultures, lifestyles, social classes, stereotypes, viewpoints, and racialized identities would have provided for much of the series' satire, comedy, and conflict.

Development 
The original Boondocks television series premiered on Cartoon Network's Adult Swim on November 6, 2005 and ran for four seasons and 55 episodes until its conclusion on June 23, 2014. During its first season, McGruder put the strip on a 6-month hiatus beginning in March 2006. He did not return to the strip the following November, and the strip's syndicate, Universal Press Syndicate, announced that it had been canceled. McGruder was not involved in the show's fourth season. Adult Swim stated, "a mutually agreeable production schedule could not be determined."

On February 6, 2019, McGruder revived the comic strip on Instagram, with the help of former supervising director Seung Eun Kim. A series of one-shots were posted to Charlamagne tha God's Instagram page. On May 29, 2019, voice actor John Witherspoon announced on Joe Rogan's 1305th episode of The Joe Rogan Experience that the series would return. Witherspoon died on October 29, 2019, with producers questioning how the show will continue. At Annecy 2019, on June 12, 2019, Sony Pictures Animation announced it would be producing a "reimagining" of The Boondocks to be co-produced with Sony Pictures Television.

On September 18, 2019, it was announced that the reboot had been picked up with a two-season order for WarnerMedia's then-upcoming streaming service HBO Max. It was also announced that McGruder would have returned as showrunner and would have serve as executive producer along with Norm Aladjem for Mainstay Entertainment as well as Seung Kim and Meghann Collins Robertson. The series would have premiered with a 50-minute special. Each season was set to consist of twelve episodes.

On February 3, 2022, it was revealed that the development of the series had been cancelled. However, it was reported that Sony was looking at alternative options. It is unknown if the death of Witherspoon had anything to do with the cancellation of the project.

References 

The Boondocks
HBO Max original programming
American animated sitcoms
American adult animated comedy television series
Animated satirical television series
Animated television series about dysfunctional families
Animated television series reboots
Anime-influenced Western animated television series
English-language television shows
Television shows based on comic strips
Television series by Sony Pictures Television
Television series by Sony Pictures Animation
Works about race and ethnicity
Unproduced television shows